The Complexe de Kawani is a multi-use sports venue in Mamoudzou, Mayotte. Its central feature, the Stade Cavani holds about 5,000 people and serves the Mayotte national football team. The complex also hosts tennis, petanque, athletics, martial arts, and gymnastics.

References

Sports venues in Mayotte
Mayotte national football team
Football venues in Mayotte
Athletics (track and field) venues in Mayotte